Johann Sebastian Bach composed  (Delightful rest, beloved pleasure of the soul), 170, a church cantata for the sixth Sunday after Trinity in Leipzig. It is a solo cantata for alto that he first performed on 28 July 1726.

History and words 

Bach composed the cantata in Leipzig for the Sixth Sunday after Trinity. The prescribed readings for the Sunday are from the Epistle to the Romans, "By Christ's death we are dead for sin", and from the Gospel of Matthew a passage from the Sermon on the Mount about better justice than the justice of merely observing laws and rules.  The text of the cantata is drawn from Georg Christian Lehms'  (1711) and speaks of the desire to lead a virtuous life and so enter heaven and avoid hell.

Bach first performed the cantata on 28 July 1726. It is regarded as part of Bach's third cantata cycle.

Bach performed it again around 1746. Bach's son Wilhelm Friedemann Bach performed the first movement around 1752 in Halle.

Scoring and structure 

It seems likely that Bach had a capable alto singer at his disposal during this period.

Bach structured the cantata in five movements, alternating arias and recitatives. He scored the work for an alto soloist and a small ensemble of oboe d'amore (Oa), two violins (Vl), viola (Va), obbligato organ (Org) and basso continuo (BC). The duration of the cantata is given as 24 minutes.

In the following table of the movements, the scoring follows the Neue Bach-Ausgabe. The keys and time signatures are taken from Alfred Dürr, using the symbol for common time (4/4).

Music 

The first aria is a da capo aria in a pastoral rhythm. The musicologist Julian Mincham notes: "The first stanza is enigmatically poetic and its essence is an evocation of that peace and inner contentment". The Bach scholar Alfred Dürr describes the mood as contemplative, and the melody of the voice as expansive, on a background of repeated quavers in the instruments.

The first recitative is secco, only accompanied by the continuo.

The second aria is set without continuo, rare in Bach's compositions, and symbolic of the lack of direction in the lives of those who ignore the word of God, as spoken about in the text. The organ plays the upper parts, which the violins and viola in unison form the lowest part.

The second recitative is accompanied by the strings and continuo. The strings play mostly long chords but illustrate the words "" (to live with God, whose name is love) by more lively movement.

The final aria is a triumphant song of turning away from the world and desiring heaven. The words "" (I feel revulsion) are expressed by an unusual tritone opening the melody. The voice is ornamented by figuration in the organ, which Bach set for flauto traverso for a performance in his last years.

Recordings 

Notable singers in the alto range recorded the cantata, male (as in Bach's time, also called altus or countertenor) and female (contralto or mezzo-soprano), including Alfred Deller, Maureen Forrester, René Jacobs, Julia Hamari, Paul Esswood, Jochen Kowalski, Nathalie Stutzmann, Andreas Scholl, Michael Chance, Guillemette Laurens, Magdalena Kožená and Robin Blaze.

 J. S. Bach: Cantatas BWV 170 & BWV 189, Elisabeth Höngen, Bavarian State Orchestra, conductor Fritz Lehmann, American Decca / Deutsche Grammophon, Archiv 1951
 J. S. Bach: Cantatas – Kantaten, Janet Baker, Academy of St Martin in the Fields, conductor Neville Marriner, Decca 1966
 J. S. Bach: Complete Cantatas Vol. 16, Bogna Bartosz, Amsterdam Baroque Orchestra, conductor Ton Koopman, Antoine Marchand 2003
 Lamento, Magdalena Kožená, Musica Antiqua Köln, conductor Reinhard Goebel, Archiv Produktion 2005
 Bach: Sacred Arias and Cantatas, David Daniels, The English Concert, conductor Harry Bicket, Virgin Classics 2008
 J. S. Bach: Solo Cantatas, Bernarda Fink, Freiburg Baroque Orchestra, conductor Petra Müllejans, Harmonia Mundi 2009
 J. S. Bach: Cantatas BWV 54, 82 & 170, Iestyn Davies (countertenor), Jonathan Cohen, Arcangelo, Hyperion 2017

References

Cited sources 
Bach Digital
 

Books
 
 

Online sources

External links 
 
 Cantata BWV 170 Vergnügte Ruh, beliebte Seelenlust history, scoring, sources for text and music, translations to various languages, discography, discussion, Bach Cantatas Website
 BWV 170 Vergnügte Ruh, beliebte Seelenlust English translation, University of Vermont
 Vergnügte Ruh, beliebte Seelenlust, BWV 170: performance by the Netherlands Bach Society (video and background information)

Church cantatas by Johann Sebastian Bach
1726 compositions